Ahmed Magdy Elhusseiny Mahmoud (born 23 April 1989 in Giza) is an Egyptian professional football player. Magdy is currently playing as a defensive midfielder with El Entag El Harby SC in Egyptian Premier League. He debuted with Egypt U23, the national team of Egypt Under-23 administered by the Egyptian Football Association.

In 2013, Wadi Degla SC loaned him to Belgian Football team KFC Turnhout. Later in the Iraqi Premier League he helped Al-Shorta SC to third place in the Championship in 2017. He has then played for several teams in Egyptian Premier League such as for Petrojet SC, Al Ittihad Alexandria Club, Wadi Degla SC. Ahmed Magdy is the twin brother of professional football player, Mohamed Magdy Elhusseiny Mahmoud.

References

External links
 

1989 births
Living people
Egyptian footballers
Wadi Degla SC players
El Entag El Harby SC players
Al Ittihad Alexandria Club players
Al-Shorta SC players
Association football defenders
Sportspeople from Giza